Boonlert Nilpirom (born 10 September 1947) is a Thai former footballer who competed in the 1968 Summer Olympics.

References

External links
 

1947 births
Living people
Boonlert Nilpirom
Boonlert Nilpirom
Footballers at the 1968 Summer Olympics
Southeast Asian Games medalists in football
Boonlert Nilpirom
Association football midfielders
Competitors at the 1969 Southeast Asian Peninsular Games
Boonlert Nilpirom